The 1962 LSU Tigers football team represented Louisiana State University during the 1962 NCAA University Division football season.

Schedule

References

LSU
LSU Tigers football seasons
Cotton Bowl Classic champion seasons
LSU Tigers football